An asymmetrical spinnaker  is a sail used when sailing downwind.  Also known as an "asym", "aspin", or "A-sail" it can be described as a cross between a genoa jib and a spinnaker. It is asymmetric like a genoa, but, the asymmetrical spinnaker is not attached to the forestay over the full length of its luff, being rigged like a spinnaker.  The asymmetrical spinnaker has a larger camber than a genoa, making it optimal for generating lift at larger angles of attack, but the camber is significantly less than that of a spinnaker.

The asymmetrical spinnaker is a specialty sail used on racing boats, bridging the performance gap between a genoa, which develops maximum driving force when the apparent wind angle is between 35 and 60 degrees, and a spinnaker, which has maximum power when the apparent wind is between 100 and 140 degrees. Due to its geometry, the sail is less prone to collapsing than a spinnaker and does not require the use of spinnaker pole. 
The sail can benefit greatly and be much larger if the boat is equipped with a bowsprit.  Some boats (e.g., the Melges 17), have retractable bowsprits for this sail.

A form of asymmetrical spinnaker is also used on cruising boats as being easier to handle than a symmetrical spinnaker and known as a "cruising chute".

Rigging is different from other spinnakers.  Maximizing performance and effective sailing of asymmetrical spinnakers requires unique sail and boat trim.  It is often paired with a Spinnaker chute.

Since the 1960s many faster sailing craft, starting with catamaran classes, had discovered that it is faster to sail downwind on a series of broad reaches with efficient airflow across the sail rather than directly downwind with the sails stalled. This technique had developed to the extent that in bar conversation at the end of one season Andrew Buckland observed that the 18 Foot Skiffs had sailed all season (1982/83) without pulling the spinnaker pole back from the forestay and that all the systems could be simplified by eliminating the pole and setting the spinnaker from a fixed (but often retractable) bowsprit. The concept quickly evolved to a sail with a loose luff much more like a conventional spinnaker than the old jib style asymmetric sails. Working with his sail maker, Andrew Buckland, Julian Bethwaite was the first to rig and sail a boat with one the next season, followed shortly by Buckland himself. The first modern both keelboat and offshore sailboats to incorporate a retractable bow sprit and an asymmetric spinnaker was the popular J/Boats J/105 designed in 1992.

The concept has spread rapidly through the sailing world. The tack of the sail may be attached at the bow like a genoa but is frequently mounted on a bowsprit, often a retracting one. If the spinnaker is mounted to a special bowsprit, it is often possible to fly the spinnaker and the jib at the same time; if not, then the spinnaker will be shadowed by the jib, and the jib should be furled when the spinnaker is in use.

The asymmetric has two sheets, very much like a jib, but is not attached to the forestay along the length of the luff, but only at the corners. Unlike a symmetric spinnaker, the asymmetric does not require a spinnaker pole, since it is fixed to the bow or bowsprit.  The asymmetric is very easy to gybe since it only requires releasing one sheet and pulling in the other one, passing the sail in front of the forestay. Asymmetrics are less suited to sailing directly downwind than spinnakers, and so instead the boat will often sail a zig-zag course downwind, gybing at the corners. An asymmetric spinnaker is particularly effective on fast planing dinghies as their speed generates an apparent wind on the bow allowing them to sail more directly downwind. It is also particularly useful in cruising yachts in the form of a cruising spinnaker or cruising chute, where the ease of handling is important.

Notes

External links 

Sailing rigs and rigging

da:Gennaker
de:Gennaker
fr:Gennaker
it:Gennaker
nl:Gennaker
fi:Genaakkeri